Dutton is a civil parish in Cheshire West and Chester, England.  It contains the village of Dutton, but is otherwise rural. Important transport links pass through the parish.  The West Coast Main Line runs through in a north–south direction.  Dutton Viaduct and the Weaver Junction (where the Liverpool branch divides from the main line) are in the parish.  The Trent and Mersey Canal runs through it in a northwest–southeast direction, and enters the south portal of the Preston Brook Tunnel.  The A533 road traverses the parish in a similar direction.  In the southern part of the parish, running east–west, is the River Weaver and the Weaver Navigation.  Included in the parish are 22 buildings that are recorded in the National Heritage List for England as designated listed buildings.  Some of the buildings are houses, and others are associated with the Trent and Mersey Canal and the Weaver Navigation.

Key

Listed buildings

See also
Listed buildings in Acton Bridge
Listed buildings in Aston-by-Sutton
Listed buildings in Crowton
Listed buildings in Daresbury
Listed buildings in Little Leigh
Listed buildings in Whitley

References
Citations

Sources

Listed buildings in Cheshire West and Chester
Lists of listed buildings in Cheshire